The Hogland Series are a series of Subjotnian sedimentary rocks exposed in the island of Gogland, the Sommer Islands and the nearby sea bottom in the Gulf of Finland. The series encompass quartz-rich conglomerates and breccias plus some volcanic rocks of mafic composition in the form of lava flows and some more silica-rich igneous rocks including quartz-porphyry. The porphyries, which lie at the top the pile, share their origin with the rapakivi granites found nearby. An exhumed Subjotnian erosion surface is exposed on the island.

References

Geology of European Russia
Mesoproterozoic
Stratigraphy of Europe